The Kuwait Gulf Oil Company (KGOC) is a national oil company in the State of Kuwait. KGOC operates under Kuwait Petroleum Corporation. It manages Kuwait's share of the natural resources in the divided zone.

History
Kuwait Gulf Oil Company was founded on February 10, 2002 to represent the state Kuwait in the Divided Zone. In 2003 KGOC took over the management of Kuwait DZ offshore area from the Arabian Oil Company Ltd. 

In 2006 KGOC started to take over the operations in the Divided Zone from Kuwait Oil Company. There are two operations committee that handles and manage the exploration and developing of hydrocarbons resources in the Divided Zones which are, Wafra Joint Operations (WJO) and Khafji Joint Operations (KJO).  

The objective of Wafra Joint Operations is to conduct onshore activities in Wafra Divided Zone in cooperation with Saudi Arabia Chevron (SAC) which conducts exploration and production on behalf of Kingdom of Saudi Arabia, whereas Khafji Joint Operations' objective is to conduct onshore and offshore activities in Khafji Divided Zone in cooperation with Aramco Gulf Operations, which manages the interests of Kingdom  Saudi Arabia.

SAC and KGOC operates the Wafra field together till it has been shut in May 2015. Since January 2016 Abdulnaser Al-Fulaji serves as CEO of KGOC.

Research
In 2017 KGOC commissioned a multi-year integrated geoscience study, conducted by CGG and experts from KGOC, to generate a exploration portfolio catalogue in the onshore Partitioned Zone (PZ).

See also 
 Petroleum industry in Kuwait
 Economy of Kuwait
 Kuwaiti oil fires

References 

Oil and gas companies of Kuwait
Energy companies established in 2002
Petroleum industry in Kuwait
Kuwaiti companies established in 2002